Khaneh Vaneh (also Romanized as Khāneh Vāneh; also known as Khana-Vona and Khānevāneh) is a village in Sardar-e Jangal Rural District, Sardar-e Jangal District, Fuman County, Gilan Province, Iran. At the 2006 census, its population was 575, in 154 families.

References 

Populated places in Fuman County